Bắc Yên is a rural district of Sơn La province in the Northwest region of Vietnam. As of 2003, the district had a population of 48,877. The district covers an area of 1,085 km2. The district capital lies at Bắc Yên.

References

Districts of Sơn La province
Sơn La province